Journey with Papa is a 1982 Italian comedy film directed by Alberto Sordi.

Plot 
Armando does not spend much time with his shy son Cristiano, so he decides to go with him a beach holiday. 
This is the first occasion for years for the two to know each other: Cristiano is a naif, idealist boy, while Armando is an egocentric and hedonist mature businessman.
During the trip the two meet various people, amongst which a wealthy friend and his wife, who betrays her husband with Armando. Cristiano accidentally discovers the relationship, generating an uproar and causing Armando to lose an important deal.
They also visit Cristiano's mother and Armando's ex-wife, who lives with a writer and has caused decadence in the family.
Armando then has a definitive rupture with his young lover, who leaves him because of his egoism, and has sex with Cristiano (ignorant of the girl's relationship with his father).
Armando, having known of the encounter, at first seems to abruptly leave Cristiano on the road, but ultimately decides to go on with the trip.

Cast 
Alberto Sordi as Armando D'Ambrosi
Carlo Verdone as  Cristiano D'Ambrosi
Edi Angelillo as  Soraya Canegatti
Giuliana Calandra as  Rita Canegatti
Tiziana Pini as Federica Benedetti
Ugo Bologna as  Eng. Rinaldo Benedetti
Angelo Infanti as  Gianni
Flora Carabella as Luciana D'Ambrosi

See also       
 List of Italian films of 1982

References

External links

Journey with Papa at Variety Distribution

1982 films
Italian comedy road movies
Films directed by Alberto Sordi
Films scored by Piero Piccioni
1982 comedy films
Films shot in Rome

1980s comedy road movies
1980s Italian-language films
1980s Italian films